Fali Sam Nariman (born 10 January 1929) is an Indian jurist. He is the senior advocate to the Supreme Court of India since 1971 and was the President of the Bar Association of India from 1991 to 2010. Nariman is an internationally recognised jurist on international arbitration. He has been honored with the 19th Lal Bahadur Shastri National Award for
Excellence in Public Administration 2018. He is one of India's most distinguished constitutional lawyers and he has argued several leading cases. He remained Additional Solicitor General of India May 1972- June 1975.

He has been awarded the Padma Bhushan (1991), Padma Vibhushan (2007) and Gruber Prize for Justice (2002) and has remained nominated member of the Rajya Sabha, the Upper House of the Parliament of India for a term (1999–2005).

Early life and education
Born in 1929 in Rangoon to Parsi parents Sam Bariyamji Nariman and Banoo Nariman, Fali did his schooling from Bishop Cotton School, Shimla. Thereafter he studied B.A. (Hon.), in Economics and History from St. Xavier's College, Mumbai, followed by a law degree (LL.B.) from the Government Law College, Mumbai in, 1950, after standing first in the Advocate's Examination and been awarded the Kinlock Forbes Gold Medal and Prize for Roman Law & Jurisprudence. His father initially wanted him to write the Indian Civil Service Examination. Since he could not afford it at that time, he chose law as his last option.

Career
Nariman started his law practice at the Bombay High Court. After practicing for 22 years, he was appointed a Senior Advocate in the Supreme Court of India in 1971, a position he retains to date. He said that "My senior's senior, Jamsetjee Kanga was my mentor. He was like a father figure to me. He died at 93 and he is the one who, at the age of 92, told me that he was still learning. He had a tremendous memory and so does my son Rohinton. He was an Ordained Priest and so is Rohinton."

Nariman was instrumental to the development of the Indian Constitution's Law. Nariman was Additional Solicitor General of India from May 1972 to 25 June 1975, resigning from that post upon the Declaration of Emergency on 26 June 1975.

Nariman argued in favour of  Union carbide in the infamous Bhopal gas disaster case, which he admitted as a mistake in recent times. He was instrumental in getting a deal between victims and the company outside court, which offered an amount of $470 million to the victims. He also argued in the famous case of the Supreme Court AoR Association, in which the Supreme Court took over the appointment of judges in the Higher Judiciary. He also appeared in many important cases like Golak Nath, S.P. Gupta, T.M.A. Pai Foundation, etc.

Nariman is the recipient of the Padma Vibhushan (in 2007) and Padma Bhushan (in 1991), respectively the second and third highest honors granted to civilians by the President of India. Both awards were for Nariman's contributions to jurisprudence and public affairs. Nariman was awarded the Gruber Prize for Justice in 2002. He dedicated his awards to his alma mater Bishop Cotton School in Shimla.

Nariman was a President-appointee member of the Rajya Sabha (the upper house of the Parliament of India) between 1999 and 2005. He has served as President of International Council for Commercial Arbitration since 1994, President of the Bar Association of India since 1991, Vice-Chairman of the Internal Court of Arbitration of the International Chamber of Commerce since 1989, honorary member of the International Commission of Jurists since 1988, member of the London Court of International Arbitration since 1988. He was appointed to the Advisory Board of the United Nations Conference on Trade and Development in November 1999, and served as Chairman of the Executive Committee of the International Commission of Jurists from 1995 to 1997.

He represented the Gujarat Government in the matter of the Narmada rehabilitation but resigned shortly after attacks on Christians in the area and the burning of copies of the Bible.

In December 2009 the Committee on Judicial Accountability stated that it considered that recommendations for judicial appointments should only be made after a public debate, including review by members of the bar of the affected high courts. This statement was made in relation to controversy about the appointments of justices C. K. Prasad and P. D. Dinakaran. The statement was signed by Ram Jethmalani, Shanti Bhushan, Fali Sam Nariman, Anil B. Divan, Kamini Jaiswal and Prashant Bhushan.

On 17.10.2014, he appeared for the former Chief Minister of Tamil Nadu J Jayalalitha in a conviction and obtained bail for her, which was earlier rejected.

Personal life
Nariman was married to Bapsi F. Nariman, since 1955, and the couple have two children, a son and a daughter and live in New Delhi. His son Rohinton Nariman was a Judge of the Supreme Court of India, who had also held the post of the Solicitor General of India from 2011 to 2013.

The Vis Moot East's Fali Nariman Award for 'Best Respondent's Memorandum' is named after Nariman.

Autobiography
Nariman's autobiography is called "Before Memory Fades".

References

External links
 Peter Gruber Foundation Honors India's Fali Sam Nariman

1929 births
Living people
Indian barristers
Indian solicitors
Parsi people from Mumbai
St. Xavier's College, Mumbai alumni
University of Mumbai alumni
Recipients of the Padma Bhushan in public affairs
Recipients of the Padma Vibhushan in public affairs
Nominated members of the Rajya Sabha
Scholars from Mumbai
Senior Advocates in India
20th-century Indian lawyers
Parsi people
Bishop Cotton School Shimla alumni